Ludwig Mehlhorn (5 January 1950 in Bernsbach – 3 May 2011 in Berlin) was a German mathematician.

1950 births
2011 deaths
Commanders of the Order of Merit of the Republic of Poland
20th-century German mathematicians
21st-century German mathematicians